Tovarnaya line was designed to connect Primorsky Rail Terminal with the city centre of Saint Petersburg. 
It was planned to construct a new terminal station between Finlyandsky Rail Terminal and the Military Medical Academy.

History 

In 1904, the line from Finlyandsky Rail Terminal to Flyugov post rail station was constructed. The engineer was P. A. Avenarius. In May 1904, this part was opened.

Catastrophic flooding on 23 September 1924 put the Primorsky Rail Terminal out of commission and all passengers were re-routed to the 
Finlyandsky Rail Terminal in 1925.

By 1926, the line to Sestroretsk had been laid through Lanskaya station. In 1929, the line was reconstructed. The stations Flyugov post and Serdobolsky stop were no longer required and they were dismantled.

References

See also
 Connecting Line
 Volkovskaya railway station

Railway lines in Russia
1520 mm gauge railways in Russia